Butia catarinensis is a mid-sized species of Butia palm native to the states of Rio Grande do Sul, Santa Catarina in Brazil.

Etymology
The specific epithet refers to the Brazilian state of Santa Catarina where it is the most distributed.

Taxonomy & nomenclature
These palms were only named as a new species in 2010, although the populations of this species were known. Before 2010 the palms growing in this region were classified as Butia capitata.

J. R. Mattos reclassified this population as B. capitata var. odorata in 1977 (see B. odorata),

As such, a number of palms under cultivation in botanical gardens, private collections or in the nursery trade under the name B. capitata or B. capitata var. odorata are in fact this species.

Larry R. Noblick and Harri Lorenzi described B. catarinensis, B. matogrossensis and B. pubispatha in 2010 in the Flora brasileira: Arecaceae (palmeiras) by Lorenzi et al. (Noblick also described B. lepidotispatha in 2010).

Description
The trunk is covered with the persistent bases of the old palm fronds. These fronds are 9–32 in number and arranged in a spiral around the trunk. Unlike other species of Butia (except B. odorata), these are usually in the same plane, but sometimes inserted at very slightly divergent angels along the rachis, but without giving the leaf a plumose aspect such as in Syagrus, and with each pair of pinnae forming a neat V-shape.

The flowers can be coloured yellow, greenish-yellow, yellow and violet, or completely violet.

The shapes of both the fruit and nut are ovoid. The ripe fruit are coloured yellow, orange, or red. The nut is without a beak or other sort protuberance on its apex.

Similar species
It is very similar to Butia odorata, a palm with a similar habitat but further south along the coast, but may be distinguished from this species by its much smaller height, almost always to just .

Distribution
It is native to the states of Santa Catarina and Rio Grande do Sul in Brazil. It grows in the lowlands situated in a relatively narrow strip along the coast from the municipalities of Araquari in Santa Catarina to Osório in Rio Grande do Sul.

Habitat
It is typically found growing not far from the coast in restinga, a type of dry, coastal, tropical thorn-scrub. It grows on coastal dunes and older stabilised dunes further inland. It appears to prefer densely vegetated or wooded environments. It grows in sandy and rocky soils.

Uses
The edible fruit of this palm are collected for myriad uses where the trees grow naturally in Brazil.

Conservation
As of 2018 the Centro Nacional de Conservação da Flora has not yet rated the conservation status for Brazil, and it is listed as 'not evaluated'.

References

catarinensis